Flat Branch Township is located in Shelby County in the U.S. state of Illinois. As of the 2010 census, its population was 443 and it contained 181 housing units.

Geography

Adjacent townships
 Moweaqua Township (north)
 Penn Township (northeast)
 Pickaway Township (east)
 Ridge Township (southeast)
 Rural Township (south)
 Assumption Township, Christian County (southwest and west)
 Prairieton Township, Christian County (west and northwest)

Demographics

References

External links
City-data.com
Illinois State Archives

Townships in Shelby County, Illinois
Townships in Illinois